I (also: i) is the debut album of Norwegian singer-songwriter Kurt Nilsen. It was released on 8 September 2003 through BMG Norway. The album topped the charts in Norway, also reaching the top 10 in Belgium, and the top 20 in Germany.

Track listing
 "Here She Comes" (Kurt Nilsen, Dag Ove Nilsen, Geir Johannessen)
 "All You Have to Offer" (Nilsen, Nilsen)
 "Breathe You In" (Christian Nystrøm, Nilsen, Nilsen)
 "Last Day of Summer" (Nilsen, Nilsen)
 "Lost in Despair" (Nilsen, Nilsen)
 "Games We Play" (Andreas Johnson)
 "Sue Me" (Nilsen, Nilsen, Johannessen)
 "Wedding's Off" (Nilsen, Nilsen)
 "Ordinary World" (Simon Le Bon, John Taylor, Warren Cuccurullo, Nick Rhodes)
 "She's So High" (Tal Bachman)
 "Smell the Roses" (Nilsen, Nilsen)
 "I"  (Nilsen, Nilsen)

Charts

References

2003 debut albums
Kurt Nilsen albums
19 Recordings albums